Merhynchites wickhami, the western rose curculio, is a species of leaf rolling weevil in the beetle family Attelabidae. It is found in North America.

Subspecies
These two subspecies belong to the species Merhynchites wickhami:
 Merhynchites wickhami rufi Hamilton
 Merhynchites wickhami wickhami

References

Further reading

 
 

Attelabidae
Articles created by Qbugbot
Beetles described in 1912